The Pitchfork Music Festival Paris 2014 was held on 30 October to 1 November 2014 at the Grande halle de la Villette, Paris, France. The festival was headlined by Belle and Sebastian, Caribou and James Blake.

Lineup
Headline performers are listed in boldface. Artists listed from latest to earliest set times.

Opening Night and After Party lineups
The opening night was held on 29 October at Le Trabendo. The after parties were held in collaboration with Red Bull Music Academy at Le Trabendo on 30 and 31 October.

References

External links

Pitchfork Music Festival
2014 music festivals